Sean M. Sullivan is a former college soccer player and currently the athletic director at The Catholic University of America in Washington, D.C., where he replaced Michael S. Allen.

Playing career
He played college soccer for four seasons (1988, 1989, 1990 and 1991) at University of California, Santa Cruz, and was named a regional All-American in 1991.

Coaching career
Sullivan was the head men’s soccer coach at the University of California, Santa Cruz (1991–1996).

Athletic director
He was interim director of athletics at the University of California, Santa Cruz (2000–2001) before holding the AD post at York College of Pennsylvania from 2004 to 2011. During the 2011–12 and 2012-13 seasons, Sullivan was Director of Athletics and Recreation at Clark University, and September 24, 2013, he was named associate vice president and director of athletics at The Catholic University of America, effective November 19.

References

Catholic University Cardinals athletic directors
Clark Cougars athletic directors
College men's soccer coaches in the United States
UC Santa Cruz Banana Slugs athletic directors
UC Santa Cruz Banana Slugs coaches
Coaches
York Spartans athletic directors
Year of birth missing (living people)
Living people
American soccer coaches
UC Santa Cruz Banana Slugs men's soccer players